NZMA is a four-letter acronym which can refer to:

New Zealand Medical Association
New Zealand Music Awards
New Zealand Muslim Association
New Zealand Management Academies